Escovedo is a surname. Notable people with the surname include: 

 Alejandro Escovedo, Mexican-American singer-songwriter
 Coke Escovedo (1941–1986), American percussionist
 Juan de Escobedo (1530–1578), Spanish politician
 Pete Escovedo (born 1935), Afro-Latin American musician, father of Sheila
 Sheila Escovedo (born 1957), better known as Sheila E, American singer, drummer, and percussionist